Bruno von Warendorp or Brun Warendorp  (died 21 August 1369, Schonen) was alderman and mayor of Lübeck, where he was born.

The son of Gottschalk Warendorp, Bruno became a ratsherr in 1366 and mayor of the Hanseatic cities in 1367. In 1368 he led Lübeck's contingent in the Confederation force which marched against Waldemar IV of Denmark. He died after Lübeck's successful siege of Helsingborg but before the stronghold was handed over. Helsingborg's capture laid the foundations for the Peace of Stralsund the following year.

Bibliography 
 Rafael Ehrhardt: Familie und Memoria in der Stadt. Eine Fallstudie zu Lübeck im Spätmittelalter. Dissertation, Göttingen 2001. Full text with a prosopography of the councillor-families of Alen, Darsow, Geverdes, Segeberg and Warendorf.
 Emil Ferdinand Fehling: Lübeckische Ratslinie, Lübeck 1925, Nr. 394.

External links 
 Other information on the war between the Hanseatic cities and Denmark

References 

1369 deaths
Mayors of Lübeck
Year of birth unknown